Main Street Historic District or Old Main Street Historic District may refer to the following places in the United States:

Main Street Historic District (Tuskegee, Alabama), listed on the National Register of Historic Places (NRHP) in Macon County
Main Street Historic District (Bristol, Connecticut), listed on the NRHP in Hartford County
Main Street Historic District (Cromwell, Connecticut), listed on the NRHP
Main Street Historic District (Danbury, Connecticut), listed on the NRHP
Main Street Historic District (Durham, Connecticut), listed on the NRHP in Middlesex County
Main Street Historic District (Manchester, Connecticut), listed on the NRHP in Hartford County
Main Street Historic District (Middletown, Connecticut), listed on the NRHP
Main Street Historic District (Willimantic, Connecticut), in the town of Windham, Connecticut, listed on the NRHP
Main Street Historic District (Tampico, Illinois), listed on the NRHP
Old Main Street Historic District (Dubuque, Iowa), listed on the NRHP in Dubuque County
Main Street Historic District (Murray, Kentucky), listed on the NRHP in Calloway County
Main Street Historic District (Baton Rouge, Louisiana), listed on the NRHP
Main Street Historic District (Broussard, Louisiana), listed on the NRHP
Main Street Historic District (Auburn, Maine), listed on the NRHP
Main Street Historic District (Damariscotta, Maine), listed on the NRHP in Lincoln County
Main Street Historic District (Fryeburg, Maine), listed on the NRHP in Oxford County
Main Street Historic District (Rockland, Maine), listed on the NRHP in Knox County
Main Street Historic District (Easthampton, Massachusetts), listed on the NRHP
Main Street Historic District (Greenfield, Massachusetts), listed on the NRHP
Main Street Historic District (Haverhill, Massachusetts), listed on the NRHP
Main Street Historic District (Millville, Massachusetts), listed on the NRHP
Main Street Historic District (Stockbridge, Massachusetts), listed on the NRHP
Main Street Historic District (Webster, Massachusetts), listed on the NRHP
Main Street Historic District (Flushing, Michigan), listed on the NRHP
Main Street Historic District (Menominee, Michigan), designated Michigan State Historic Site; listed on the NRHP as the "First Street Historic District."
Main Street Historic District (Milan, Michigan), listed on the NRHP in Washtenaw County
Main Street Historic District (Bay St. Louis, Mississippi), listed on the NRHP in Hancock County
Main Street Historic District (Vicksburg, Mississippi), listed on the NRHP in Warren County
Main Street Historic District (Bozeman, Montana), listed on the NRHP in Gallatin County
Main Street Historic District (Miles City, Montana), listed on the NRHP
Main Street Historic District (Red Cloud, Nebraska), listed on the NRHP in Webster County
Main Street Historic District (Addison, New York), listed on the NRHP
Main Street Historic District (Afton, New York), listed on the NRHP in Chenango County
Main Street Historic District (Brockport, New York), listed on the NRHP
Main Street Historic District (Cold Spring Harbor, New York), listed on the NRHP in Suffolk County
Main Street Historic District (Cuba, New York), listed on the NRHP in New York
Main Street Historic District (Geneseo, New York), listed on the NRHP in New York
Main Street Historic District (McGraw, New York), listed on the NRHP in Cortland County
Main Street Historic District (Medina, New York), listed on the NRHP in New York
Main Street Historic District (Millerton, New York), listed on the listed on the NRHP in Dutchess County
Main Street Historic District (New Hamburg, New York), listed on the NRHP in New York
Main Street Historic District (Roslyn, New York), listed on the NRHP in New York
Main Street Historic District (Roxbury, New York), listed on the NRHP in Delaware County
Main Street Historic District (Stone Ridge, New York), listed on the NRHP in New York
Main Street Historic District (Whitehall, New York), listed on the NRHP in Washington County
Main Street Historic District (Brevard, North Carolina), listed on the NRHP in Transylvania County
Main Street Historic District (Forest City, North Carolina), listed on the NRHP in Rutherford County
Main Street Historic District (Hendersonville, North Carolina), listed on the NRHP in Henderson County
Main Street Historic District (Marion, North Carolina), listed on the NRHP in North Carolina
Main Street Historic District (Rutherfordton, North Carolina), listed on the NRHP in Rutherford County
Main Street Historic District (Bowling Green, Ohio), listed on the NRHP in Wood County
Main Street Historic District (Genoa, Ohio), listed on the NRHP in Ottawa County
Main Street Historic District (Spring Valley, Ohio), listed on the NRHP in Greene County
Main Street Historic District (Westerly, Rhode Island), listed on the NRHP in Rhode Island
Main Street Historic District (Woonsocket, Rhode Island), listed on the NRHP in Rhode Island
Main Street Historic District (Newberry, South Carolina), listed on the NRHP in Newberry County
Main Street Historic District (Chappell Hill, Texas), listed on the NRHP in Washington County
Main Street Historic District (Darlington, Wisconsin), listed on the NRHP in Lafayette County
Main Street Historic District (Fort Atkinson), listed on the NRHP in Wisconsin
Main Street Historic District (Lake Geneva, Wisconsin), listed on the NRHP in Walworth County
Main Street Historic District (Mayville, Wisconsin), listed on the NRHP in Dodge County
Main Street Historic District (Menomonee Falls, Wisconsin), listed on the NRHP in Waukesha County
Old Main Street Historic District (Racine, Wisconsin), National Register of Historic Places listings in Racine County
Main Street Historic District (Thiensville, Wisconsin), listed on the NRHP in Ozaukee County
Main Street Historic District (Trempealeau, Wisconsin), listed on the NRHP in Trempealeau County
Main Street Historic District (Waupaca, Wisconsin), listed on the NRHP in Waupaca County
Main Street Historic District (Whitewater, Wisconsin), listed on the NRHP in Walworth County
Mathias Mitchell Public Square–Main Street Historic District, listed on the NRHP in Portage County, Wisconsin
Main Street Historic District (Buffalo, Wyoming), listed on the NRHP in Johnson County

See also
Downtown Main Street Historic District (disambiguation)
East Main Street Historic District (disambiguation)
Lower Main Street Commercial Historic District, Boise,Idaho, U.S.
Main Avenue Historic District (disambiguation)
North Main Street Historic District (disambiguation)
South Main Street Historic District (disambiguation)
Upper Main Street Historic District (disambiguation)
West Main Street Historic District (disambiguation)